Bright Grey, the second studio album by hardcore punk band The Steal, was released on CD and vinyl by Banquet Records. Its cover appears to be a homage to that of Spiderland by the post-rock band Slint.

Track listing
The Possibilities Are Endless
Disconnected
Dave Gets Mad
No Control
Fashionless
The Angles
Repeat
Keep Moving Forward
Got Ideas
Horror Vacui
Breathe In
Statues
Kids With Kids
Keep It Simple

External links
 BanquetRecords.com

2008 albums
The Steal albums